"That's What I Call Love" is a 1989 song by Australian singer Kate Ceberano. It was released as the fourth and final single from her third solo album, Brave. It was also included on the She-Devil soundtrack. It was released in February 1990 and peaked at 30 in Australia in April 1990.

Track listing
CD Single/ Vinyl (K1027)
 "That's What I Call Love" - 4:02
 "Catalonian Knights" (Kate Ceberano And Her Sextet) - 5:32

Charts

Weekly Charts

References 

Kate Ceberano songs
1989 songs
1990 singles
Songs written by Kate Ceberano
London Records singles